This list of ship launches in the 1610s includes a chronological list of some ships launched from 1610 to 1619.

References 

1610s ships